Frunze Vaghinaki Dovlatyan (May 26, 1927 in Gavar – August 30, 1997 in Yerevan) was an Armenian film director and actor. People's Artist of USSR (1983).

Biography
Frunze Dovlatyan was born in Gavar, Soviet Armenia. He was a theater actor before becoming a director. One of the leading Armenian directors, Frunze Dovlatyan has started as actor in Armenian provincial theatres since 1941 and then in Gabriel Sundukian Drama Theatre of Yerevan, where he was awarded Stalin Prize (major award of that time) for the role of Hrair in the play "These Stars are Ours", Russian version "Эти Звезды Наши". After graduating the Directing Department of VGIK Moscow (master class of S. Gerasimov). His most well-known film is Barev, yes em (State Prize of Armenia, 1967). He died in Yerevan at age of seventy. He headed Armenfilm studio in 1980's.

Filmography 
 1961 - Dima Gorin's Career
 1966 - Hello, That's Me!
 1968 - Saroyan Brothers, creative adviser
 1972 - Chronicle of Yerevan Days (Khoren Abrahamyan)
 1979 - Live Long, co-script, dir.
 1982 - Cry of a Peacock, co-script
 1982 - International Conference in Venice, script, dir., doc.
 1982 - Center of Mkhitarian's, doc.
 1985 - Bridge of Cultures, doc.
 1990 - Nostalgia (Karot)

References

External links 
 
 Biography at Kyavar.com
 

1927 births
1997 deaths
People from Gavar
Soviet Armenians
Armenian male film actors
Armenian film directors
Soviet male actors